Nashville Historic District is a national historic district located at Nashville, Nash County, North Carolina.  It encompasses 142 contributing buildings and 3 contributing structures in the rural county seat of Nashville. The buildings primarily date between 1890 and 1930, and include notable examples of Greek Revival, Italianate, Queen Anne, Colonial Revival, and Classical Revival style architecture.  Located in the district are the separately listed Bissette-Cooley House and Nash County Courthouse.  Other notable buildings include the Graphic Building (c. 1910), Baldy Batchelor Livery Stable (c. 1900), Weldon's Department Store (1913), Ricks-Strickland House (1890s), Squire Harper House (1868), two metal-veneered "Lustron houses," Neville-Strickland House (1907), Primitive Baptist Church, First Methodist Church (1923), and former Baptist Church.

It was listed on the National Register of Historic Places in 1988.

References

Historic districts on the National Register of Historic Places in North Carolina
Queen Anne architecture in North Carolina
Greek Revival architecture in North Carolina
Colonial Revival architecture in North Carolina
Neoclassical architecture in North Carolina
Italianate architecture in North Carolina
Buildings and structures in Nash County, North Carolina
National Register of Historic Places in Nash County, North Carolina